Kızılgeçit is a small village in Silifke district of Mersin Province, Turkey. At  it is situated in Limonlu Creek valley of Toros Mountains . The population of Kızılgeçit was 85  as of 2011.

References

Villages in Silifke District